KUPX-TV (channel 16) is a television station licensed to Provo, Utah, United States, broadcasting the Ion Television network to Salt Lake City and the state of Utah. It is owned and operated by the Ion Media subsidiary of the E. W. Scripps Company alongside Fox affiliate KSTU (channel 13). KUPX-TV's offices are located on Lawndale Drive in the southern section of Salt Lake City, and its transmitter is located on Farnsworth Peak in the Oquirrh Mountains, southwest of Salt Lake City.

History
There are two methods of accounting the station's history: by license and by "intellectual unit", which is the combination of a station's call letters, programming, network affiliation and staff. As the result of two local marketing agreements (LMAs) that began in 1998, which launched a process that culminated in a station swap in 1999, the KUPX license history differs from the intellectual unit history prior to April 21, 1998.

License history
On April 24, 1985, the Federal Communications Commission (FCC) granted an original construction permit to build a full-power television station on UHF channel 16 to serve Provo and the Salt Lake City television market. The new station, originally owned by Morro Rock Resources, Inc., was given the call letters KZAR-TV, it was then sold to Royal Television of Utah, Inc. in October 1985. Royal Television had considerable difficulty in constructing the station, as evidenced by several applications to change transmitter location and several construction permit extensions, and even replacements of expired construction permits. In 1988, the station's callsign was deleted, then restored four months later. In July 1990, Royal Television applied to replace the construction permit that was to expire the following month. The application was not granted until February 1996, more than five years later. In September 1995, Roberts Broadcasting agreed to buy the station from Royal Broadcasting, and the deal was consummated in May 1996. In February 1996, the same day that the FCC approved the sale of the station from Royal Television to Roberts Broadcasting, Paxson Communications sent a proposal to Roberts to acquire a 50% share in the station. The proposal was unsuccessful.

On August 22, 1997, ACME Communications agreed to acquire a 49% stake in KZAR-TV, with an agreement to purchase the other 51% once the television station was on the air. Jamie Kellner, CEO and co-founder of ACME, was also co-founder and at the time, CEO of The WB, so it was naturally assumed that KZAR-TV would affiliate with that network. In February 1998, KZAR-TV changed its call letters KUWB in anticipation of the upcoming WB affiliation.

On April 20, 1998, Paxson entered into an agreement with Roberts Broadcasting and ACME Communications where each station would acquire the other's assets, but WB programming would remain on channel 30. To expedite the process, the parties immediately entered into local marketing agreements, whereby the stations would swap call signs and would begin to operate each other's stations until the FCC could approve the assignments of license. The following day, the stations executed the LMAs. KUPX (channel 30) in Ogden became KUWB and KUWB (channel 16) in Provo adopted the KUPX call letters. Meanwhile, Roberts and ACME continued to own KUPX, but operated KUWB. Two days following the execution of the LMAs, KUPX applied for a license for channel 16 in Provo and the station became operational. The license was approved by the FCC on May 29, 1998. Paxson and Roberts Broadcasting/ACME filed formal assignment of license applications in May 1998 and the FCC approved the swap in March 1999. ACME Communications followed through on its agreement to acquire the remaining 51% of KUPX in November 1998 and the deal was consummated in February 1999. ACME and Paxson consummated the station swap agreement in September 1999 and took full ownership of the stations that they had already been operating under the LMAs.

Originally, KUPX was an outlet for inTV, a shopping and infomercial network owned by Paxson Communications, but on August 31, 1998, Paxson launched a family-oriented network called Pax TV, which KUPX as its owned-and-operated station for the market. Through Pax, KUPX also aired programming from The Worship Network during the overnight hours as well as infomercials and religious programs. On July 1, 2005, Paxson Communications became Ion Media Networks and Pax TV rebranded as i: Independent Television. The network again renamed itself to Ion Television on January 29, 2007.

KUPX intellectual unit history prior to the swap
The KUPX intellectual unit began September 6, 1996, when Paxson Communications agreed to acquire channel 30, then known as KOOG-TV, from Alpha & Omega Communications LLC. The station had previously been the WB affiliate in the Salt Lake City, and Paxson continued that affiliation, but also replaced Home Shopping Network programming with Paxson's infomercial network, inTV, and religious programming. KOOG-TV changed its call letters to KUPX in February 1998, and the intellectual unit moved over to channel 16 in April 1998, when ACME Communications and Roberts Broadcasting, co-owners of channel 16, and Paxson Communications, owners of channel 30, agreed to allow each other to manage their stations leading up to the station swap, which was completed in September 1999.

Sale to Scripps
On September 24, 2020, the Cincinnati-based E. W. Scripps Company announced that it would purchase Ion Media for $2.65 billion, with financing from Berkshire Hathaway. With this purchase, Scripps will divest 23 Ion-owned stations, but no announcement has been made as to which stations that Scripps will divest as part of the move. The proposed divestitures will allow the merged company to fully comply with the FCC local and national ownership regulations. Scripps has agreed to a transaction with an unnamed buyer, who has agreed to maintain Ion affiliations for the stations. Scripps chose to keep KUPX-TV, making it a sister station to Fox affiliate KSTU (channel 13). The sale was completed on January 7, 2021.

Technical information

Subchannels 
The station's digital signal is multiplexed:

Analog-to-digital conversion 
On April 3, 1997, the FCC adopted its Sixth Report and Order , establishing digital television service allotments . In the initial allotment, the FCC assigned UHF channel 29 for KOOG-DT, the companion channel to UHF channel 30 in Ogden, later to become KUPX-DT. In the station swap, which was initiated in April 1998, the allocation for KUPX-DT was treated as part of the KUPX intellectual unit, and became the companion channel for Provo UHF channel 16, although channel 29 was still officially assigned to Ogden in the Digital Table of Allotments. Paxson Communications filed an application for KUPX-DT in July 1998. As part of a significant reallocation of DTV stations approved by the FCC in May 2000 , the city of license for KUPX-DT officially moved from Ogden to Provo in the DTV Table of Allotments. The FCC granted a construction permit to build KUPX-DT in March 1999 and Paxson Communications applied for a license for the DTV station in May 2002, which the FCC granted on November 7, 2002. The station's digital signal transmits from Farnsworth Peak, while the analog signal's transmissions originated from Lake Mountain until the digital transition in June 2009.

KUPX-TV shut down its analog signal, over UHF channel 16, on June 12, 2009, as part of the federally mandated transition from analog to digital television. The station's digital signal remained on its pre-transition UHF channel 29, using PSIP to display KUPX-TV's virtual channel as 16 on digital television receivers.

Translators 
The station is rebroadcast on many translators throughout Utah.
 Castle Dale: K28PR-D
 Clear Creek: K29IW-D
 Delta, etc.: K33KW-D
 Duchesne: K28PH-D
 East Carbon County: K19MF-D
 East Price: K26OI-D
 Ferron: K28KQ-D
 Fillmore, etc.: K35NX-D
 Fountain Green: K33OU-D
 Fremont: K31LA-D
 Garrison, etc.: K13AAM-D
 Green River: K23JV-D, K28PN-D
 Helper: K25PM-D
 Huntington: K28KR-D
 Juab: K18GX-D
 Kanarraville, etc.: K33KF-D
 Leamington: K12QY-D
 Manti–Ephraim: K30KJ-D
 Mount Pleasant: K18IV-D
 Nephi: K26PK-D
 Orangeville: K23OH-D
 Parowan–Enoch–Paragonah: K26OA-D
 Richfield, etc.: K23NU-D
 Roosevelt: K25PH-D
 Rural Beaver County: K21KL-D
 Salina–Redmond: K04RV-D
 Scipio: K23OD-D
 Spring Glen: K33KI-D
 Teasdale: K22MV-D
 Utahn: K15LW-D
 Cortez, CO: K16CT-D
 Malad City, ID: K26OY-D

References

External links

Ion Television affiliates
Grit (TV network) affiliates
Laff (TV network) affiliates
Bounce TV affiliates
Defy TV affiliates
TrueReal affiliates
Scripps News affiliates
E. W. Scripps Company television stations
UPX-TV
Television channels and stations established in 1998
Mass media in Salt Lake City
Provo, Utah
1998 establishments in Utah